Pieros Sotiriou (born on January 13, 1993) is a Greek Cypriot professional footballer who plays as a striker for Sanfrecce Hiroshima in Japan and the Cyprus national team.

Sotiriou joined FC Copenhagen in 2017 from APOEL of the Cypriot First Division. In February 2020, he moved to Kazakh side FC Astana.

Career

Olympiakos Nicosia
Sotiriou was born in Nicosia, Cyprus. He is a product of Olympiakos Nicosia academies. He made his official debut with Olympiakos in the 2009–10 season, when the club was competing in the Cypriot Second Division, appearing in four matches and scoring one goal. On 19 March 2011, he made his Cypriot First Division debut, playing the last 11 minutes in a match against Doxa Katokopias and he added a further five appearances in the 2010–11 season. The next season (2011–12), he made 16 league appearances (2 at starting line-up, 14 as a substitute) and scored his first Cypriot First Division goal on 18 September 2011, in the third matchday against APOEL where Olympiakos lost by 1–4. In June 2012, it was rumoured that Sheffield Wednesday was interested in him and also on 5 August 2012, he was trialled at S.L. Benfica, but finally stayed at Olympiakos. On 16 November 2012, he renewed his contract with Olympiakos, signing a three-year contract extension. His most productive season with Olympiakos came in 2012–13, when he appeared in 29 league matches (28 at starting line-up, 1 as a substitute) and scored 8 goals.

At the end of the 2012–13 season, he has been awarded the "Young player of the season" award by Cyprus Football Association.

APOEL
On 24 December 2012, it was announced that Sotiriou's transfer from Olympiakos to APOEL FC was already agreed by the two clubs (for a transfer fee of €90,000), but he stayed to Olympiakos until the end of the 2012–13 season and his four-year contract with APOEL activated in June 2013.

He made his debut on 29 August 2013, in the 2013–14 UEFA Europa League play-off match against Zulte Waregem at GSP Stadium, coming on as a 68th-minute substitute in APOEL's 1–2 defeat. During the 2013–14 season, he appeared in three 2013–14 UEFA Europa League group stage matches for APOEL and won all the titles in Cyprus, the Cypriot League, the Cypriot Cup and the Cypriot Super Cup.

He scored his first official goal for APOEL on 20 September 2014, netting the second goal in APOEL's 3–1 away victory against Ayia Napa in the Cypriot First Division. On 10 December 2014, he made his first group stage appearance, coming on as a 65th-minute substitute in APOEL's 4–0 defeat against Ajax at Amsterdam Arena. On 15 December 2014, he scored twice in APOEL's enthralling 4–4 home draw against AEK Larnaca in the First Division. In the 2014–15 season, he managed to add two more titles to his collection, as APOEL won again both the Cypriot championship and the 2014–15 Cypriot Cup.

On 28 April 2016, Sotiriou scored the opening goal against title rivals AEK Larnaca and sealed the victory which secured APOEL's fourth consecutive Cypriot First Division title.

He scored his first goal in European competitions on 19 July 2016, netting the second goal in APOEL's 3–0 home win against The New Saints in the second qualifying round UEFA Champions League. On 24 August 2016, Sotiriou opened the scoring in APOEL's 1–1 home draw against FC Copenhagen in the Champions League play-off round, but his goal was not enough as his team were defeated 1–2 on aggregate and dropped down to the Europa League group stage.

On 19 September 2016, Sotiriou signed a three-year contract extension with APOEL, running until 31 May 2020.

On 29 September, he scored the only goal in APOEL's 1–0 away victory against Greek club Olympiacos in the Europa League group stage. On 3 November 2016, he scored again in the group stage in APOEL's 1–0 home victory against Swiss side BSC Young Boys. He scored his first ever hat-trick on 8 January 2017, in APOEL's 5–0 home win against Aris Limassol in the 2016–17 First Division. On 23 February 2017, he scored with a flying volley against Athletic Bilbao, as APOEL won 2–0 at home and overturned the 3–2 deficit from the first leg to advanced to the last 16 of the Europa League for the first time in their history. Following his successful 2016–17 season with APOEL, Sotiriou awarded the "Player of the season" award by Cyprus Football Association.

FC Copenhagen
On 25 April 2017, it was announced that FC Copenhagen had secured his signature on a five-year contract running from 1 July 2017, for an undisclosed transfer fee from APOEL, reported to be around €2.5 million.

Astana
On 20 February 2020, FC Astana announced the signing of Sotiriou on a three-year contract. The transfer fee paid to Copenhagen was reported as DKK37 million (about €5 million, £4 million).

Ludogorets Razgrad
In February 2021, Sotiriou moved to Bulgarian club Ludogorets Razgrad on a three-and-a-half-year deal.

Sanfrecce Hiroshima
On 15 August 2022, Sotiriou signed to J1 club, Sanfrecce Hiroshima for during mid season in 2022. Also, in the Levain Cup final of the same year, he scored a tie goal and a come from behind goal and was awarded the MVP, contributing greatly to the team's victory in the Levain Cup.

International career
On 10 October 2012, Sotiriou was called for the first time into the Cyprus national football team for the 2014 FIFA World Cup qualification matches against Slovenia and Norway, but he remained on the bench in both matches. He made his debut for the national team on 14 November 2012, in a friendly match against Finland at GSP Stadium, coming on as a 63rd-minute substitute in Cyprus' 0–3 defeat. He scored his first international goal on 13 November 2016, netting the second goal in Cyprus' 3–1 home victory against Gibraltar in the 2018 FIFA World Cup qualifiers.

Personal life
On December 28, 2019 Sotiriou married with Cypriot journalist Maria Kortzia, after eight years of relationship. They have two sons: Sophocles (born December 9, 2020) and Giorgos (born June 14, 2022).

Career statistics

Club

International

Scores and results list Cyprus' goal tally first.

Honours

Club
APOEL
Cypriot First Division: 2013–14, 2014–15, 2015–16, 2016–17
Cypriot Cup: 2013–14, 2014–15
Cypriot Super Cup: 2013

Copenhagen
Danish Superliga: 2018–19

Astana
Kazakhstan Super Cup: 2020

Ludogorets Razgrad
Bulgarian First League: 2020–21, 2021–22
Bulgarian Supercup: 2021

Sanfrecce Hiroshima
J.League Cup: 2022

Individual
Cyprus Football Association Young Player of the Season: 2012–13
Cyprus Football Association Player of the Season: 2016–17
Bulgarian First League Top Goalscorer: 2021–22

References

External links
APOEL official profile

1993 births
Living people
Greek Cypriot people
Cypriot footballers
Sportspeople from Nicosia
Cyprus international footballers
Cyprus under-21 international footballers
Cyprus youth international footballers
Association football forwards
Cypriot First Division players
Cypriot Second Division players
Danish Superliga players
Kazakhstan Premier League players
First Professional Football League (Bulgaria) players
J1 League players
Olympiakos Nicosia players
APOEL FC players
F.C. Copenhagen players
FC Astana players
PFC Ludogorets Razgrad players
Sanfrecce Hiroshima players
Cypriot expatriate footballers
Expatriate men's footballers in Denmark
Expatriate footballers in Kazakhstan
Expatriate footballers in Bulgaria
Expatriate footballers in Japan